Peter Edis Nieketien (born 26 November 1968 in Port Harcourt) is a former Nigerian football player.

Career
He has professional played with Iwuanyanwu Nationale, Julius Berger F.C., Kedah FA and Terengganu FA in Malaysia. In the early 1990s,he played for Gabonese clubs AS Douanes, ASMO FC and Delta Téléstar Gabon Télécom FC. He played his last two seasons in Germany for SG Bad Soden and retired in summer 1997.

International career
Nieketien played for the Nigeria national under-20 football team the 1987 FIFA World Youth Championship in Chile and earned three matches in the tournament.

References

1968 births
Living people
Nigerian footballers
Nigeria youth international footballers
Nigeria under-20 international footballers
Nigerian expatriate footballers
Expatriate footballers in Germany
Association football midfielders
Expatriate footballers in Malaysia
Sportspeople from Port Harcourt
Nigerian expatriate sportspeople in Germany
Bridge F.C. players
Expatriate footballers in Gabon
Nigerian expatriate sportspeople in Malaysia
Heartland F.C. players
Ranchers Bees F.C. players
Delta Téléstar players
Terengganu FC players